Craig Coxhead is a New Zealand judge who is currently serving as Chief Justice of Niue.

Coxhead graduated from the University of Waikato in 1994 with a Bachelor of Laws. He worked in private practice before becoming a lecturer at the University of Waikato Law School. He served as president of Te Huinga Roia Māori o Aotearoa – the New Zealand Māori Law Society.

Coxhead was appointed to the Māori Land Court on 25 January 2008. In 2011 he was appointed as a judge of the High Court of Niue, and in 2016 as a Justice of the High Court of the Cook Islands. He was appointed Chief Justice of Niue on 22 November 2018, replacing Patrick Savage.

References

New Zealand judges on the courts of Niue
Living people
Year of birth missing (living people)
Māori Land Court judges
Chief justices of Niue
20th-century New Zealand lawyers
University of Waikato alumni
Members of the Waitangi Tribunal
New Zealand judges on the courts of the Cook Islands
High Court of the Cook Islands judges
21st-century New Zealand judges